Dejanira may refer to:

 An alternative spelling of the princess Deianira, wife of Hercules
 157 Dejanira, an asteroid
 Dejanira (insect), a beetle in the family Cerambycidae